William Aspinall may refer to:

William Aspinall (fl. 1960–1970), rugby league footballer
William H. Aspinall (fl. 1960–1970), rugby league footballer

See also
William Aspinwall (disambiguation)